Madame's cravings, is a 1906 French silent short film produced by the Gaumont Film Company and directed by Alice Guy-Blaché.

Plot summary
The film features a pregnant woman who succumbs to the "cravings" related to her pregnancy. We see her, in wide shots, stealing things she wants to swallow and, in close-ups, the heroine inserting objects into her mouth: the lollipop she stole from a little girl, the glass of absinthe she swallows greedily, the fillet of herring she sniffs and devours, and finally a pipe she smokes while choking and pulling on it as if she can't help herself. Each of these close-ups reveals the happy expression on her face, as if this oral pleasure fulfilled her perfectly.

Production and Release
The film, directed by Alice Guy-Blaché and produced by the Gaumont Film Company, was released in 1906.

Analysis

The film is composed of 5 scenes, comprising 15 shots, linked by continuity editing. Each of the scenes combines full shots with a medium close-up of the woman, played by Alice Guy, taking into her mouth and enjoying what she has just stolen.

Richard Abel notes that this film shows "an early dramatic use of the close-up"  and Alison McMahan conjectures that it may be the fact that Alice Guy had used medium close-ups in her phonoscènes (forerunners of sound film) that led her to such use of a close-up in this film.

Iris Brey qualifies this film as the "first female gaze film". She notes that the use of close-ups  "underlines and creates the emotion felt by the heroine. [...] Madame a des envies marks the beginning of an aesthetic that focuses on the sharing of an experience: desire."  

 
This film remains in her eyes Guy's "most provocative film because it bases its plot on the sexual desires of a pregnant woman, which - still today - remains more than taboo. Alice Guy understands that she must twist the body and the camera to capture this female desire. She explores the filmic form to reach her goal: that the spectators feel the pleasure of the pregnant woman. She is therefore the first to use the close-up to intensify the drama of the scene."

The film ends with the heroine finding a baby in a cabbage patch, a reference to her first film, La Fée aux Choux, which, as stressed by Iris Brey, shows the continuation of Guy's will "to tell stories related to the female condition and the construction of the female gender."

Karen Ward Mahar stresses that "the focus of this film is a woman who is satisfying her own desire, not unconsciously providing visual pleasure for men in the audience as was true for so many early peep-show-style films." She concludes that "for Americans reformers, such a film would undoubtedly underscore the moral depravity of moving pictures, and of French films in general."

References

External links
 
 Madame a des envies (1907) Madame's cravings at A Cinema History

1906 films
French silent short films
French black-and-white films
1906 short films
Films directed by Alice Guy-Blaché
French comedy short films
1906 comedy films
Silent comedy films